The Duan Albanach (Song of the Scots) is a Middle Gaelic  poem. Written during the reign of Mael Coluim III, who ruled between 1058 and 1093, it is found in a variety of Irish sources, and the usual version comes from the Book of Lecan and Book of Ui Maine.

It follows on from the Duan Eireannach, which covers the earlier mythological history of the Gael. 

It is a praise poem of 27 stanzas, probably sung at court to a musical accompaniment by the harp. If performed in a public context, it is possible that the audience would have participated in the performance.

The Duan recounts the kings of the Scots since the eponymous Albanus came to Alba. The poem begins with the following stanzas.

In the final stanzas it is seen that the poem dates from the time of Malcolm III, in the second half of the 11th century.

See also
 The Prophecy of Berchán
 Pictish Chronicle
 Chronicle of the Kings of Alba
 Senchus fer n-Alban
 Flann Mainistreach

External links
Duan Albanach - English Trans. by William F. Skene
Duan Albanach at CELT (translated)

Medieval Scottish literature
Texts of medieval Ireland
Irish literature
11th century in Scotland
Irish-language literature
Scottish Gaelic poems